Zahns Corners is an unincorporated community in Pike County, in the U.S. state of Ohio.

Scioto Valley Local School District operates Zahn's Corner Middle School in the community.

References

Unincorporated communities in Pike County, Ohio